Lisgoold is a village and civil parish in County Cork, Ireland. Lisgoold is in the Roman Catholic Diocese of Cloyne, and is served by St John the Baptist Catholic church. Lisgoold is part of the Cork East Dáil constituency.

Sport 
The local Gaelic Athletic Association club, Lisgoold GAA, have pitch and gymnasium facilities in the village. The club have Junior A hurling and football teams. The nearest soccer club is Carrigtwohill United AFC, which plays at Ballyadam, which is between Carrigtwohill and Lisgoold. Horse racing is also represented in the area, with "point-to-point" races held in the area.

Notable residents 
 Maurice Riordan, poet and editor
 Crystal Swing, country music group
 Paul Townend, jockey

References

Towns and villages in County Cork
Civil parishes of County Cork